Colm McCoy (2 December 1936 – 22 July 2010) was an Irish boxer. He competed in the men's light heavyweight event at the 1960 Summer Olympics. At the 1960 Summer Olympics, he lost to Matti Aho of Finland by decision in the Round of 32.

References

External links
 

1936 births
2010 deaths
Irish male boxers
Olympic boxers of Ireland
Boxers at the 1960 Summer Olympics
Sportspeople from Dublin (city)
Light-heavyweight boxers